Kate Scott may refer to:
 Kate Scott (academic)
 Kate Scott (sportscaster)
 Kate Scott Turner, née Scott, American poet
 Kate Parker Scott Boyd, née Scott, American artist, journalist, and temperance worker
 Kate Scott, Trinity Blood character

See also
 Katherine Scott (disambiguation)